The Council of Italy, officially, the Royal and Supreme Council of Italy was a ruling body and key part of the government of the Spanish Empire in Europe, second only to the monarch himself. It was based in Madrid and administered the Habsburg territories in Italy: the Kingdom of Naples, the Kingdom of Sicily, and the Duchy of Milan. Before the 1556 creation of the Council, Spanish possessions in Italy were administered by the Council of Aragon.

History
By the year 1556, the Crown of Aragon had complete dominance over Southern Italy and the Duchy of Milan. Local councils and viceroys (in Naples and Palermo) or governors (in Milan) controlled the internal affairs of these lands. In an effort to better coordinate Spanish rule in Italy, Philip II decided to separate the Italian states from the Council of Aragon in 1556; thus, Naples, Sicily and Milan were incorporated into the newly created Council of Italy and were represented by two regents each (one Castilian, one native-born).

Most of the Spanish viceroys and governors in Italy were Castilian rather than Italian, reflecting the Crown's desire to transform the Empire into a predominantly Castilian one.

The island of Sardinia remained under the jurisdiction of Council of Aragon until its eventual transfer to Austria and later Savoy. In 1713, Charles VI established a "Supreme Council of Spain" with its seat in Vienna, in order to assert his sovereignty over all the Spanish states which belonged to the Habsburgs. This council also had jurisdiction over territories in the Council of Italy, until its abolition by Philip V on 1 May 1717.

Structure 
The Council of Italy consisted of:
 One President, chosen from the Spanish high nobility;
 Six Regents, two for the Kingdom of Sicily, two for the Kingdom of Naples, and two for the Duchy of Milan. For each of these territories, one of the regents was Spanish and the other was a naturale, i.e. native of the territory. Both were to be leetrados, that is experts in utroque iure (canon law and civil law).
 Several officials stations in their dependencies, including three secretaries (one for each possession), a Fiscal advocate who managed the interests of the state, and a Conservator General of the Patrimony who managed the administration of the crown's patrimony.

Functions 
The Council of Italy was responsible for all affairs of state and law concerning the Italian states governed by the Habsburg main line. It nominated the viceroys of Sicily, viceroys of Naples, and the Governors of the Duchy of Milan to the Spanish Council of State which was presided over by the king, and it approved the more important civil and military appointments in the individual states. The council's functions were solely consultative. Its opinion was reported in a document (consulta), edited by the secretary, which was then submitted to the king, who then annotated it with his own decision. If there was no unanimous decision in the council, the opinions of different members were all reported.

See also
 Kingdom of Naples
 Kingdom of Sicily
 Duchy of Milan
 State of the Presidi
 Italian War of 1551–59

References

Spanish Empire in Europe
Legal history of Italy